Paratoxodera cornicollis, common name giant Malaysian stick mantis, is a species of praying mantis found in Indonesia (Java).

See also
List of mantis genera and species

References

Mantidae
Mantodea of Asia
Insects described in 1889